Timokten (also spelled Timoktene, Timekten, or Tamekten) is a town and commune in Aoulef District, Adrar Province, in south-central Algeria. According to the 2008 census it has a population of 18,598, up from 14,134 in 1998, with an annual growth rate of 2.8%.

Geography 

Other settlements, such as Zaouiet Moulay Heïba, lie around the northern and eastern sides of this oasis. is a part of the Tidikelt region of the central Sahara that extends from central eastern Adrar Province (where Aoulef is located) to northeast Tamanrasset Province around In Salah. The oases in this region are sparser than in the Tuat and Gourara regions in which most of the population of Adrar Province live, but there are still a number of towns such as Aoulef, Akabli, Tit and In Ghar. The nearby land is mostly flat aside from some small hills to the east; however further north the land rises to the Tademaït plateau.

Climate 

Timokten has a hot desert climate (Köppen climate classification BWh), with extremely hot summers and mild winters, and very little precipitation throughout the year.

Transportation 

The same provincial road also leads northwest to Adrar,  to the northwest.

Education

7.8% of the population has a tertiary education, and another 17.1% has completed secondary education. The overall literacy rate is 79.4%, and is 90.7% among males and 67.2% among females.

Localities
As of 1984, the commune was composed of 11 localities:

Iner
Zaouiet Moulay Heïba
Kasbet Sied
Kasbet Djena
Bled El Mehdi El Mansour
Ouled Moulay Rachid
Ezzouïa
El Merguieb
Gaougaou
Aoulef El Kébir
Akhannous
Ouled El Hadj
Bled Lahssiène
Aïn Belbal
Matriouan Timokten

References

Neighbouring towns and cities

Communes of Adrar Province
Cities in Algeria
Algeria